Il dolce rumore della vita (internationally released as The Sweet Sounds of Life) is a 1999 Italian romance-drama film directed by Giuseppe Bertolucci. It premiered at the 56th Venice International Film Festival, and entered the competition at the 1999 Mar del Plata Film Festival, in which Bertolucci was awarded as best director.

Cast 
Francesca Neri: Sofia
Rade Šerbedžija: Bruno Maier 
Niccolò Senni: Bruno at 15 
Rosalinda Celentano: Lolita
Olimpia Carlisi: Prostitute
Alida Valli: Grandmother of Sofia
Marina Confalone

References

External links

1999 films
1999 romantic drama films
Films directed by Giuseppe Bertolucci
Italian romantic drama films
1990s Italian-language films
1990s Italian films